Hugh Dunsterville was Archdeacon of Cloyne  from 1661 until 1665.

Dunsterville was educated at Trinity College, Dublin.  He held livings at Kinvarra; Annaghdown; Kilbrogan;  and Dunderrow.  Dunsterville was appointed a Prebendary of Kilmacduagh in 1638; of Clonfert in 1639; and of Cork in 1661.

His father was Archdeacon of Kilmacduagh  from 1630 until 1637.

References

Archdeacons of Cloyne
Alumni of Trinity College Dublin
17th-century Irish Anglican priests